Miri Aloni (born December 25, 1949) is an Israeli singer and actress.

Biography
Aloni was born in Givatayim. 

Aloni enlisted into the army in 1968, serving in the Nahal band. In the seventies and eighties she played in various bands, including Apocolypse, and had major roles in several movies and TV series'. She was married to Samuel Omni.

Minutes before Prime Minister Yitzhak Rabin was murdered at a political rally in November 1995, Miri Aloni sang the Israeli pop song Shir Lashalom (Song for Peace).

She lived in Germany from 1999 to 2002. In 2006, Nitzan Gilady made a video of her life: Singing to Oblivion – The Story of Miri Aloni. In later years, she was known for her street performances at Carmel Market in Tel Aviv.

Filmography
 Smart Gamaliel (1973)
 Marriage Made in London (1979)
 Silent Love (1982)
 Ahava Ilimeth (1985)

Recordings
 "Mona Lisa of the Twentieth Century" (1973)
 "Women from Brecht"
 "Drop of Love (Ahava peep)" (1987)
 "A Little Bit of Love" (2002)

External links

 
 Song list (in Hebrew)
 Jewish Journal.com

1949 births
Living people
20th-century Israeli women singers
Israeli film actresses
Israeli television actresses
Israeli folk singers
Israeli rock singers
Jewish folk singers